Diana Roselyn Trask (born 23 June 1940) is an Australian-born country and pop singer. In the early 1960s she was a regular pop music performer on United States TV shows, Don McNeill's Breakfast Club and Sing Along with Mitch. From 1968 to 1981 she was a country music singer in the US and in Australia. In the US, she had eighteen singles on the Billboard Hot Country Songs chart, where her top 20 hits are "Say When" and "It's a Man's World (If You Have a Man Like Mine)" (both 1973), "When I Get My Hands on You" and "Lean It All on Me" (both 1974). In January 1962 she married Thom Ewen, a Connecticut businessman, to become Diana Ewen. In the 1980s Trask withdrew from performing to look after Ewen, who had had a stroke: he subsequently died in 2009. The couple have two children. Trask co-authored her autobiography, Whatever Happened to Diana Trask: A Memoir, with Alison Campbell Rate, on 1 May 2010.

Early career

Diana Roselyn Trask was born on 23 June 1940 in the Melbourne suburb of Camberwell and raised in the then-rural town of Warburton. Her father was Lew, who ran a furniture business, and her mother is Thelma (née Salisbury), who was a music teacher. Trask sang from an early age, performing at school functions and for her family. In August 1949 she won the Under 10 Solo Girls category at the Lilydale Eisteddfod. At 16, she received formal vocal lessons from her mother. She became a part of a singing group.

Trask won a talent show, TV Quest, in 1957. She signed with Lee Gordon as her promoter. Her first two singles were "Going Steady" (1958) on W&G and "Lover Is Another Name for Fool" (1959) on Gordon's Leedon label. Gordon arranged for her to open for international visitors, including Frank Sinatra and Sammy Davis Jr., who each toured Australia in early 1959.

Acting on encouragement from Sinatra and Davis, Trask relocated to the United States. In August 1959 she debuted as a jazz singer at New York City's Blue Angel club. She became a regular on Don McNeill's Breakfast Club TV show and appeared as a dancer and singer on Jack Benny's TV show. Mitch Miller gave her a recording contract in 1960 with Columbia Records and also a regular spot on his TV show, Sing Along with Mitch.

By 1961 Trask was earning A£44,000 per year and lived at the Middletown Hotel, NYC. Late that year she became engaged to Thom Ewen, a businessman from Connecticut; they married in Warburton's Roman Catholic Sacred Heart Church, on 7 January 1962. Ewen, who was 34 years old, had recently divorced his first wife, who retained custody of the couple's two children.

Trask released two albums, Diana Trask (1961) and Diana Trask on TV (1962), via Columbia, which were geared towards the pop market but neither was successful. After Miller's show was cancelled in 1964 Trask and Ewen moved to Melbourne to continue her career. She appeared regularly on In Melbourne Tonight on GTV-9 during that year. In 1965 she hosted her own 13-week TV variety programme, Di Trask Show, with Ewen as producer for the same channel. According to Nan Musgrove of The Australian Women's Weekly it "wasn't all that popular here but sold like hot cakes overseas in 26 countries."

Country career

In 1967 Trask and Ewen returned to the US and initially settled in NYC and then in Nashville; where she started as a country singer. She signed with Dial Records that year, and in July 1968 had her first charting single, "Lock, Stock, and Tear Drops", which reached the top 70 on the Billboard Hot Country Songs.

Trask signed a record deal with Dot Records and released an album, Miss Country Soul (March 1969), which provided her nickname and reached No. 34 on the Billboard Top Country Albums chart. It was produced by Joe Tex and included her cover versions of his work. Her versions of Tex's R & B tracks, "Hold What You've Got" and "Show Me", display a soulful voice. They drew critical acclaim, while the lead single, "Hold What You've Got" (July 1968), reached the top 60. Rubber City Reviews Tim Quine opined "I wouldn’t throw away the original, but Trask seems pretty comfortable taking the women's point of view on her version of Joe's hit 'Show Me'."

Trask released her fourth studio album, From the Heart, in November 1969, which peaked at No. 32. It provided her version of Patsy Cline's "I Fall to Pieces" (March 1970), which reached No. 37. She followed with a cover version of George Jones' "Beneath Still Waters" (February), which reached No. 38. Trask released her seventh studio album, Its a Man's World, in March 1974, which peaked at No. 25. It provided three singles, which reached the top 20 country songs chart, "Say When" (May 1973), "It's a Man's World (When You Have a Man Like Mine)" (August) and "When I Get My Hands on You" (February 1974).

She followed with Lean It all on Me (July 1974) and its title single, "Lean It All on Me" (May 1974) –  her highest charting track, reaching No. 13 on the country charts. It was also issued as a single in the United Kingdom via Ember Records, backed with "Behind Closed Doors". She also toured the UK with Glen Campbell who wrote the sleeve notes for her Ember album. She continued with Dot Records singles, "If You Wanna Hold On (Hold on to Your Man)" (October 1974) and "Oh Boy" (March 1975), which are her last top 40 country hits. In January 1976, "Oh Boy" received a gold record in Australia.

Later career and present

Trask continued releasing albums and singles with Dot Records until 1977. She made a brief comeback via the Kari label with two non album singles, "This Must Be My Ship" (April 1981) and "Stirrin' Up Feelings" (September). The Ewen family returned to Australia, where she resumed her career. In 1979 Roger Climpson, host of Australia's version of This Is Your Life, surprised her during a rehearsal for the TV tribute show. Trask wrote the track, "I Think About Your Lovin'", which was recorded by the Osmonds in 1982. In April 1982, her album One Day at a Time was certified gold in Australia.

In the 1980s Trask withdrew from performing to look after Ewen, who was incapacitated following a stroke: the couple lived on a yacht and cruised the Caribbean until Ewen's health began to fail in the late 1980s. From 2006 the couple lived in Woodbine GA until Thom Ewen died in 2009, after which Trask resided in nearby St. Mary's. Trask co-authored her autobiography, Whatever Happened to Diana Trask: A Memoir, with Alison Campbell Rate, which was published on 1 May 2010.

Discography

Television

References

External links
Official website

1940 births
Living people
Singers from Melbourne
Australian country singer-songwriters
Australian country singers
Dot Records artists
Australian women pop singers
Australian expatriates in the United States
Australian women singer-songwriters
People from Camberwell, Victoria
People from Yarra Ranges